Mike Goodwin is an Oregonian professional fund raiser currently working as CEO of the Oregon State University Foundation. He is also on the board of trusties for the Council for Advancement and Support of Education.

References 

Living people
People from Oregon
Oregon State University people
Year of birth missing (living people)